Abu-Lughod is a surname. Notable people with the surname include:

Ibrahim Abu-Lughod (1929-2001), Palestinian-American political scientist
Janet Abu-Lughod (1928-2013), American sociologist
Lila Abu-Lughod (born 1952), Palestinian-American anthropology professor

Compound surnames